Remte Parish is an administrative unit of Saldus Municipality, Latvia. The administrative center is Remte village. It's located on the shore of Remtes Lake. The village was built around the Remte Manor.

Towns, villages and settlements of Remte parish 
 Kaulači
 Remte
 Smukas
 Stūrīši

See also 
 Remte Manor

References

External links 
 

Parishes of Latvia
Saldus Municipality
Courland